The Peru national under-16 and under-17 basketball team is a national basketball team of Peru, administered by the Peru Basketball Federation (Spanish: Federación Deportiva Peruana de Basketball) (F.D.P.B.).
It represents the country in international under-16 and under-17 (under age 16 and under age 17) women's basketball competitions.

It appeared at the 2015 South American U17 Basketball Championship for Women.

See also
Peru women's national basketball team
Peru women's national under-19 basketball team
Peru men's national under-17 basketball team

References

External links
 Peru Basketball Records at FIBA Archive

Basketball in Peru
Basketball teams in Peru
Women's national under-17 basketball teams
Basketball